The Doornfontein Synagogue or Lions Synagogue is the oldest synagogue still in use in Johannesburg, South Africa.

The synagogue is located at 120 Siemert Road, New Doornfontein, two blocks from Ellis Park Stadium. To the left of the synagogue was a Jewish Community Center, which was added in the 1950s as part of an extension to the building. This was later sold off and converted for other uses as the congregation's membership resettled to other suburbs. The synagogue was led by Rabbi Ilan Herrmann until 2017. Herrmann had served the congregation for the last 18 years. Today, the synagogue usually has about 60 congregants for weekly Shabbat services and about 200 congregants for the High Holy Days. Most current congregants live outside of Doornfontein, in Sandton, Morningside and Highlands North.

History
The neighbourhood of Doornfontein was founded in 1886, and after wealthy residents moved to more affluent neighbourhoods in the aftermath of the Anglo-Boer War, Doornfontein became popular with Jewish immigrants from the United Kingdom and Western Europe. Beit Street in Doornfontein was once the commercial hub of the neighborhood, with Kosher butchers and other Jewish merchants. During the 1880s, religious services were held at the nearby Rand Club and at private residences. 

The Lions Synagogue was the third synagogue to be built in the neighborhood. It was built in 1905 at a cost of £4,000 and nicknamed the "Lions Synagogue" (also commonly known as Lions Shul) after the two cast iron lions watching over either side of the entrance. The architect was Morrie Jacob Harris. A fire damaged the building in 1930. It has been completely restored, but the original look has therefore changed.

References 

Buildings and structures in Johannesburg
Synagogues in South Africa